There are many instruments which can be or are commonly referred to as four string guitars.

Guitar family instruments with four strings

 Bass guitar
 Braguinha
 Cak used in Kroncong music
 Cavaquinho
 Celovic used in Tamburica orchestras
 Cuatro Venezolano
 Tenor guitar
 Ukulele
 Cigar box guitars often have three or four strings.
 Duitara used in Khasi music

Guitar family instruments with four courses of strings

 The Renaissance guitar.
 Brac and Bugaria used in Tamburica orchestras
 Some Chitarra Battentes
 Some Kabosys
 Tahitian ukulele
 Tiple